Now That's What I Call Rock is a compilation album released on January 22, 2016, by the distributors of the popular Now That's What I Call Music series in the United States. The collection brings together a diverse group of artists from a range of styles such as "EDM textures, summer festival blues-rock chug, arena alternative, post-Tool hard rock, triumphant psych-pop and cosmopolitan retro experiments."

Development
Despite the popularity of the Now albums, rock compilations have been an area of neglect by record companies. To reach out to a broad audience, the first rock volume of Now features contemporary pop acts with rock roots and takes a "big-tent" approach to the genre. Cliff Chenfeld, co-owner of the Razor & Tie and a consultant for Now That’s What I Call Rock, feels "most music listeners are pretty open" and this release "is a means of introducing some of those bands to that broader audience who I think would embrace it."

The compilers of the set wanted to avoid defining what rock music is in 2016, but instead tried to give what people think it is, "as opposed to using a term for rock that might have defined what rock" used to be.

Track listing

Reception
James Christopher Monger of AllMusic notes the "wide range of rock subgenres" represented in this compilation.

Chart performance

References

2016 compilation albums
Rock
Rock compilation albums